The 1996 United States presidential election in Alabama took place on November 5, 1996, as part of the 1996 United States presidential election. Voters chose nine representatives, or electors to the Electoral College, who voted for president and vice president.

Alabama was won by Senator Bob Dole (R-KS), with Dole winning 50.12% to 43.16% over President Bill Clinton (D) by a margin of 6.96%. Billionaire businessman Ross Perot (Reform-TX, although listed as an "Independent" in Alabama) finished in third, with 6.01% of the popular vote.

President Clinton became the first Democrat to carry Montgomery County since Adlai Stevenson II in 1952. The last Democrat to carry Alabama was Carter in 1976.

, this is the last time a Democrat has carried any of the following counties: Butler, Chambers, Cherokee, Clarke, Coosa, Crenshaw, Etowah, Fayette, Franklin, Marion, Pickens, Walker and Washington.

No subsequent Democratic presidential nominee has been able to match Clinton’s 43.16% popular vote share. As of 2020, this remains the last time that Alabama was decided by a single-digit margin. 

This is also the last presidential election in which Alabama did not vote the same as neighboring Tennessee.

Results

Results by county

See also
United States presidential elections in Alabama

References

Alabama
1996
1996 Alabama elections